The Oakville AVA  is an American Viticultural Area located within Napa Valley AVA and centered on the town of Oakville, California. The appellation extends over a flat expanse of well-drained gravel soil between the Vaca and Mayacamas Mountains.  Oakville AVA is known for its success with Bordeaux varietals, which have produced wines of rich texture, firm tannins, and notes of mint and herbs.

Geography and climate
The soil of the Oakville AVA is the result of sedimentary deposits from the hills that form Napa Valley.  The soil is gravelly and sandy, with exceptionally good drainage.  The portion of the AVA between State Route 29 and the Silverado Trail is a mix of clay and well-drained sandy loam.  Oakville AVA has a warm climate well-suited to wine grape production.  Wind and fog arriving from San Pablo Bay can affect the morning and evening hours, but their effects are limited by the intervening Yountville Mounts.

History
By 1877, Crabb had planted  and was producing 50,000 gallons (189,250 liters) of wine per year.
The historic To Kalon Vineyard, owned by the Robert Mondavi Winery, Andy Beckstoffer and four other owners, is still producing grapes today.

In 1903, the United States Department of Agriculture established an experimental vineyard station in Oakville.  Known as "Oakville Station", the vineyard is operated by the University of California at Davis.   Oakville AVA was officially declared a sub-appellation of Napa Valley in 1993.

Wineries
There are over 50 wineries located within, or source their grapes from vineyards in, the Oakville AVA.  Many are small, boutique wineries (like Harlan Estate, Screaming Eagle and Spoto Wines) with limited production.

References

External links
 Oakville Winegrowers

American Viticultural Areas of the San Francisco Bay Area
Napa Valley
Geography of Napa County, California
1993 establishments in California
American Viticultural Areas